Băile Govora (or just Govora) is a Romanian spa town in Vâlcea County, about  south-west of Râmnicu Vâlcea and west of the Olt river, in the historical region of Oltenia. Notable features of the town (beside its mineral springs, recommended for a variety of ailments) include the Govora abbey (built in the 15th century and consolidated by Matei Basarab and later by Constantin Brâncoveanu) and the nearby Dintr-un lemn Monastery (16th or 17th century; the legend of its origin was recorded by Paul of Aleppo).

Govora Abbey was the site where Matei Basarab introduced the first printing press in Wallachia – where the first written code of laws in Romanian was published, Pravila de la Govora, in 1640.

The town administers three villages: Curăturile, Gătejești, and Prajila.

Notable people
 Mihai Constantinescu (1932–2019), film director and screenwriter.

References

External links

 Baile Govora spa direct link: Băile Govora spa site
 Romanian tourism site: Băile Govora and Dintr-un lemn Monastery
  Vâlcea County tourist spots: Băile Govora
  Information about Govora Resort

Towns in Romania
Spa towns in Romania
Populated places in Vâlcea County
Localities in Oltenia